The 1963 European Cup Winners' Cup Final was the final football match of the 1962–63 European Cup Winners' Cup and was the third European Cup Winners' Cup final. It was contested between Tottenham Hotspur of England and the defending champions, Atlético Madrid of Spain, and was held at Feijenoord Stadion in Rotterdam, Netherlands. Tottenham won the match 5–1 thanks to goals by Jimmy Greaves (2), John White and Terry Dyson (2). Tottenham's victory made them the first British team to win a major European trophy.

Tottenham's next major trophy came four years later when they won the FA Cup in 1967, but Jimmy Greaves was the only player from this team to feature in the next Tottenham side to win a major trophy due to the bulk of the team having retired or been transferred over the next four years. John White was killed by lightning on a golf course the following year.

Route to the final

Match

Details

See also
Atlético Madrid in European football
Tottenham Hotspur F.C. in European football

External links
UEFA Cup Winners' Cup results at Rec.Sport.Soccer Statistics Foundation
1963 European Cup Winners' Cup Final at UEFA.com
Match report

3
Cup Winners' Cup Final 1963
Cup Winners' Cup Final 1963
1963
Cup Winners' Cup Final 1963
Cup Winners' Cup Final
Cup Winners' Cup Final
Cup Winners' Cup Final
May 1963 sports events in Europe
Sports competitions in Rotterdam
20th century in Rotterdam